W. J. and Ed Smith Building, also known as H.P. Authorson Meat Market and Charles Coon Billiard Hall, is a historic commercial building located at West Plains, Howell County, Missouri. It was built in 1894, and is a two-story, three bay, brick commercial building with Italianate style design elements.  There are two first-floor storefronts and second floor living spaces.  It has two concrete rear additions; one built about 1923 and the other about 1952.  It is located next to the West Plains Bank Building.

It was listed on the National Register of Historic Places in 2001.  It is located in the Courthouse Square Historic District.

References

Individually listed contributing properties to historic districts on the National Register in Missouri
Commercial buildings on the National Register of Historic Places in Missouri
Italianate architecture in Missouri
Commercial buildings completed in 1894
Buildings and structures in Howell County, Missouri
National Register of Historic Places in Howell County, Missouri